Herbert Leggatt (26 October 1868 – 23 May 1945) was a Scotland international rugby union player.

Rugby Union career

Amateur career

He played for Watsonians.

Provincial career

He played for Edinburgh District in the 1890 inter-city match.

He played for East of Scotland District that same season in 1891.

He played for Cities District against the Anglo-Scots in 1892.

International career

He made his debut with the national team during the game Scotland v Wales at Edinburgh, 7 Feb 1891.
His last game was Scotland v England at Edinburgh, 17 Mar 1894
He played 9 international games between 1891 and 1894.

Family

He was born in Madras Presidency, India on 26 Oct 1868 to George Russell Leggatt and Catherine Ann Pritchard.

Death

Herbert Thomas Owen Leggatt passed away on 23 May 1945 in Southport, Lancashire, England.

References

Scotland international rugby union players
1946 deaths
1868 births
Watsonians RFC players
Scottish rugby union players
East of Scotland District players
Edinburgh District (rugby union) players
Cities District players